Julius Perstaller (born 8 April 1989) is a professional footballer who plays as a forward for SV Telfs.

Life and career 
Julius came through the youth system at FC Wacker Innsbruck, playing for the affiliated junior team BNZ Tirol.

After two seasons with Austrian Regional League sides WSG Wattens and SV Hall, Julius has played in the FC Wacker Innsbruck first team in the First League (2008–10) and the Bundesliga (2010–11). In April–May 2010 he scored in six consecutive games for the club.

Julius has also gained international recognition at under-21 level. He scored his first goal for the Austria under-21s in a 2-2 draw with Albania under-21s in a November 2009 qualifying match for the 2011 UEFA European Under-21 Football Championship.

Honours 

FC Wacker Innsbruck:

Winner
Austrian Football First League: 2009-10

References 

1989 births
Living people
Austrian Football Bundesliga players
Austrian footballers
Association football forwards
FC Wacker Innsbruck (2002) players
SV Ried players
3. Liga players
Regionalliga players
Austrian Regionalliga players
Austrian expatriate sportspeople in Germany
Austrian expatriate footballers
Expatriate footballers in Germany
Austria youth international footballers
Austria under-21 international footballers
Sportspeople from Innsbruck
Footballers from Tyrol (state)
FC Hansa Rostock players
SV Elversberg players